Bruce Anthony Thompson (born February 9, 1965) is an American politician from the state of Georgia. He is a member of the Republican Party and represented the 14th district in the Georgia State Senate. He is currently a Georgia Labor Commissioner.

Early life and education
Thompson graduated Big Sandy High School in 1983 and Montana State University–Northern with an associates degree in business in 1985. He graduated from Reinhardt University with a bachelor in business administration in 2021.

Career
Thompson served in the U.S. Army National Guard for four years in tanks. He works as an insurance agent, as owner of an Allstate firm. Thompson chaired the Cartersville-Bartow Chamber of Commerce and served as chairman of Personnel at Cartersville First Baptist Church. He was elected to the Georgia Senate on December 3, 2013, to fill out the remainder of the term of Barry Loudermilk, who resigned to focus on his campaign for a seat in the United States House of Representatives.

In 2021, Thompson announced his candidacy for the Republican nomination for Georgia Labor Commissioner in the 2022 elections. He won the nomination, with Mike Coan finishing in second place. Thompson won the general election on November 8.

Personal life
Thompson lives in Cartersville, Georgia. He and his wife, Becky, have two children.

References

External links
Campaign Website
Georgia State Senate Official Page

 

 

1965 births
Living people
21st-century American politicians
American businesspeople
Insurance agents
Montana State University–Northern alumni
National Guard (United States) personnel
People from Bartow County, Georgia
Place of birth missing (living people)
Reinhardt University alumni
Republican Party Georgia (U.S. state) state senators
State labor commissioners in the United States
United States Army soldiers